The Alpes Graiae et Poeninae, later known as Alpes Atrectianae et Poeninae (officially Alpes Atrectianae et Vallis Poenina), were a small Alpine province of the Roman Empire created after the merging of the Alpes Poeninae (or Vallis Poenina) and the Alpes Graiae (or Alpes Atrectianae), probably during the reign of Claudius (41–54 AD). Comprising the modern Canton of Valais (Switzerland), the Tarantaise Valley (France), and the Val d'Aosta (Italy), it was one of the three provinces straddling the Alps between modern France and Italy, along with the Alpes Maritimae and Alpes Cottiae.

The province had two capitals, most likely since its creation: Forum Claudii Ceutronum (modern-day Aime-la-Plagne) for the Alpes Graiae, and Forum Claudii Vallensium (modern-day Martigny) for the Alpes Poeninae. The procurator of the province resided alternatively in one of the two chief towns.

Name 
The province was commonly called Alpes Graiae, Alpes Atrectianae, Alpes Graiae et Poeninae, or Alpes Atrectianae et Poeninae, as a shortened form of its full name. In some documents, the province is also named Alpes Poeninae et Graiae, or Alpes Poeninae.

It may have been known as the Alpes Graiae et Vallis Poenina at the time of its creation, which could have been the official form of the shortened name Alpes Graiae et Poeninae. From the 2nd century AD until the reign of Diocletian (284–305), it was officially known as Alpes Atrectianae et Vallis Poenina, which is attested on an inscription from the Severian period (193–235).

According to Livy, the name Alpes Poeninae derives from an indigenous deity named Poeninus, who is attested as Poininos on local inscriptions and in the name Jupiter Poeninus. It survives in the modern form Pennine Alps, as does Vallis Poenina in the name Valais. Xavier Delamarre has proposed to similarly see a theonym *Graios (found in Herculi/Herculeio Graio) in the name Alpes Graiae. The name Alpes Atrectianae may derive from a local kinglet called Atrectius, just like the Alpes Cottiae are named after Cottius. While his existence is not attested, the cognomen appears in the name of four governors of the province from the 2nd and 3nd centuries AD.

History 

The region of Vallis Poenina, corresponding to the modern Canton of Valais between the Lake Geneva and the Great St. Bernard Pass, was inhabited at the time of the Roman conquest by Celtic tribes known as the Vallenses, namely the Nantuates, Veragri, Seduni, and Uberi. After the Roman invasion led by Augustus in 16–15 BC, the area was initially placed under military control (praefectus Raetis, Vindolicis, vallis Poeninae) and incorporated into the province of Raetia et Vindelicia, which stretched between the central Alps and the Danube.

The Vallensian tribes were granted Latin Rights and grouped together into a single civitas Vallensium during the reign of Claudius (41–54 AD). According to most scholars, Vallis Poenina was separated from Raetia et Vindelicia and united with the newly created Alpes Graiae, located west of the Little St Bernard Pass and inhabited by the Ceutrones, during the same period. They formed together the province of Alpes Graiae et Poeninae, with one chief town for each division: Forum Claudii Ceutronum or Axima (modern Aime-la-Plagne) for the Alpes Graiae, and Forum Claudii Vallensium or Octodorus (modern Martigny) for the Alpes Poeninae.

During the reign of Diocletian (284–305), the province was integrated into the praeses of the Diocese of Gaul. Some scholars date the unification of the Alpes Graiae and Alpes Poeninae to this period rather than the reign of Claudius. In 381, the first Bishop of the region, Theodul, was mentioned. After the Fall of the Western Roman Empire, the region was invaded by the Burgundians and incorporated into their kingdom. After its fall, it was integrated into the Frankish Kingdom in 534, then briefly invaded by the Lombards in 574.

Gallery

References

Primary sources

Bibliography 

Provinces of the Roman Empire
Tres Alpes
States and territories established in the 1st century BC
Ancient Switzerland
History of Aosta Valley
Praetorian prefecture of Gaul
476 disestablishments
470s disestablishments in the Roman Empire